

Six ships of the Royal Navy have borne the name HMS Pluto, after Pluto, a God of Roman mythology:

  was an 8-gun fire ship purchased from civilian service in 1745 when she had been named Roman Emperor.  She was sold in 1747.
  was an 8-gun fire ship purchased from civilian service in 1756 when she had been named New Concord. She was sold in 1762.
 HMS Pluto was previously , a 16-gun sloop.  She was renamed HMS Pluto when she was converted into a fire ship in 1777. The French privateer  captured her on 30 November 1780. Plutos subsequent fate is unknown.
  was a 14-gun fire ship of the Royal Navy launched in 1782. Pluto was converted to a sloop in 1793. She spent the period of the French Revolutionary Wars on the Newfoundland station where she captured a French naval vessel. During the Napoleonic Wars Pluto was stationed in the Channel. There she detained numerous merchant vessels trading with France or elsewhere. Pluto was laid up in 1809 and sold in 1817 into mercantile service. The mercantile Pluto ran aground near Margate on 31 August 1817 and filled with water.
  was a wood paddle gunvessel launched in 1831 and broken up in 1861.
  was an  launched in 1944 and sold in 1972.

Other
  was a vessel built in 1822 at Calcutta as a steam dredge but that was converted to a gun-vessel during the first Anglo-Burmese War. After the war the British East India Company sold her and she became a coal hulk (minus her engines) that sank in a gale.
  was a steam frigate of the Indian Navy that the Bombay Dockyard launched for the British East India Company on 12 September 1843.

In fiction
A fictional HMS Pluto appears as the admiral's flagship in the Horatio Hornblower novel A Ship of the Line.

See also

HMS Conundrum – drums used for laying a pipeline for Operation Pluto.

Citations

References
 

Royal Navy ship names